Vibha Dadheech is an Indian classical dancer in the Kathak dance form.  She began learning Kathak from Raigarh Court dancer Pt. Firtu Maharaj, and later in Guru Shishya Parampara from Pt. Shambhu Maharaj as a ganda bandh shagird, living and learning at her guru’s home. She is also the senior-most disciple and wife of Puru Dadheech. Together they founded the  Natavari Kathak Nritya Academy, Indore. Currently, Vibha Dadheech is serving as Professor Emeritus at world’s first dedicated Kathak Research centre at the Sri Sri University, The Sri Sri Centre for Advanced Research in Kathak. 

Vibha graduated in 1988 with a doctorate PhD in Kathak from Indira Kala Sangeet Vishwavidyalaya Khairagarh. Her topic for research was Dance Hand Gestures - Bharatiya Nritya ki Varnamala: Hast Mudrayen. Which include more than 1100 hand gestures with their definitions from approximately 23 shastra granthas. It also happens to be one of the most awarded research and is also a published book by the same name.

Dadheech has been felicitated with India’s highest award to a performing artist, the Sangeet Natak Akademi Award and Madhya Pradesh's highest Civilian Award The Shikhar Samman.

She was awarded the Senior Fellowship from the Ministry of Culture, Govt. Of India in Kathak for years 2011–12.

She is an author and published her research book Bharatiya Nritya ki Varnamala: Hast Mudrayen (ABC of Indian Dance Gestures) in Hindi language. Hardcover - 2003   Her book has also been prescribed for the Bachelor level of Dance syllabus at University of Indore, Govt. of Madhya Pradesh.

Vibha has received the Life-time Achievement Award 2015 at the 25th Gopi Krishna Mahotsav, Mumbai for serving Kathak for over 50 years. She collaborated with 40 other artists to create Kala Arpan that was launched by Sri Ravi Shankar.

Family

Vibha was born to noted Gandhian freedom fighter Shri Bhramarji Gupta and Purna Gupta at Bilaspur (then Madhya Pradesh). She is the youngest of four siblings and is married to the Kathak dancer and educationist Puru Dadheech. She has two sons.

Education
 Doctorate in Kathak 1988 from Indira Kala Sangeet Vishwavidyalaya Khairagarh 
 Kathak under Guru Shishya Parampara from Pt. Firtu Maharaj and Pt. Shambhu Maharaj

Awards

 Sangeet Natak Akademi Award Akademi Puraskar for 2021 (SNA)
 Shikhar Samman 2018 - Madhya Pradesh's highest civilian award (for excellence in Kathak dance)
 Senior Fellowship 2011 by Ministry of Culture, Govt. of India
 Lifetime Achievement Award 2015 for serving Kathak for over 50 years, at 25th Gopi Krishna Mahotsav

Books

 BHARTIYA NRITYA KI VARNMAALA HAST MUDRAYEN (The ABC of Indian Dance Hand Gestures) 
 NRITYA NIBANDH, Bindu Prakashan 2009 
 GAT NIKAS - KATHAK NRITYA KA APARIHARYA ANG, Bindu Prakashan. Researched under Senior Fellowship by Ministry of Culture, Government of India, 2019.

References

Kathak exponents
Living people
1954 births
Recipients of the Sangeet Natak Akademi Award